Heart Lake 167 is an Indian reserve in Alberta.

References 

Indian reserves in Alberta
Cree reserves and territories